Errol Knott Moorcroft (born 1940) is a South African politician, farmer, and author who served as the member for Albany from 1981 to 1994 in the Parliament of South Africa. He later served as the Federal Chairperson of the Democratic Party from 1997 to 2000.

Early life 
Moorcroft was born in 1940 in the rural town of Adelaide, Eastern Cape and spent his childhood living on a family farm. He finished his school career at Queen's College Boy's High School located in Queenstown, Eastern Cape and soon after graduated from the Grootfontein College of Agriculture in 1959. During his time at the Grootfontein College of Agriculture he served as the head of the Students Representative Council. He then attended Rhodes University in Grahamstown, graduating with a bachelor of arts degree in 1964. Due to his excellent performance at Rhodes University, Moorcroft was awarded the Abe Bailey Travel Bursary which allowed him to attend the University of Oxford in England. While attending the University of Oxford he played on the university's rugby team. He graduated from the University of Oxford with a Master of Letters (MLitt) degree in 1967.

Career 
After graduating from the University of Oxford, Moorcroft returned to South Africa and worked as a lecturer at Rhodes University in 1968 and worked as a full-time farmer from 1969 to 1981. His political career began when he was elected to be the Progressive Federal Party member for Albany in the National Assembly of South Africa. He later became a Democratic Party member of the Senate of South Africa in 1994 and continued serving until 1999 in the National Council of Provinces.

He succeeded Ken Andrew as the federal chairperson of the Democratic Party in 1997 and returned to the National Assembly in 1999; serving as the Shadow Minister of the Environment in the Shadow Cabinet of Tony Leon. He was later the Democratic Alliance spokesperson on Agriculture, Land Affairs, Tourism, Water Affairs, and Forestry, but retired from politics in 2004 to once again practice farming.

Personal life 
Moorcroft resides in Eastern Cape. In 2018, he published his book The Wool-Classer, the Shearers, and the Golden Fleece.

References 

1940 births
Living people
White South African people
South African people of English descent
Progressive Federal Party politicians
Democratic Party (South Africa) politicians
Democratic Alliance (South Africa) politicians
Members of the House of Assembly (South Africa)